Krishna Kuchela is 1961 Indian Malayalam-language Hindu mythological film directed and produced by Kunchacko. Revolving around the Hindu god Krishna and his friend Kuchela, the film stars Prem Nazir, KPAC Sulochana, Hari, T. S. Muthaiah and Ambika Sukumaran. It was released on 18 November 1961 and became a box-office bomb.

Plot 
The story is the mythological relationship between Krishna and Kuchela.

Cast 
 Prem Nazir as Krishna
 Sathyan
 T. S. Muthaiah as Kuchela
 KPAC Sulochana as Kuchela's wife
 Ragini
 B. S. Saroja

Soundtrack 
The music was composed by K. Raghavan and lyrics were written by P. Bhaskaran.

Release and reception 
Krishna Kuchela was released on 18 November 1961, nine days after another film based on the same story, Bhakta Kuchela. Though Bhakta Kuchela was a box office success, Krishna Kuchela was not. According to historian B. Vijayakumar, "The presence of Prem Nazir as Krishna, T S Muthiah as Kuchela and KPAC Sulochana as Kuchela's wife simply failed to attract viewers to the theatres."

References

External links 
 

1960s Malayalam-language films
1961 films
Films about Krishna
Films directed by Chitrapu Narayana Rao
Films directed by Kunchacko
Films based on the Bhagavata Purana